Randall L. Schweller is Professor of Political Science at The Ohio State University, where he has taught since 1994.

He earned his PhD from Columbia University in 1993 and was as an Olin Fellow at Harvard University in 1993-94.  His primary teaching and research interests include international security and international relations theory, and he is perhaps best known for his Balance of Interests theory, a revision to Kenneth Waltz's Balance of Power theory and Stephen Walt's Balance of Threat theory.  His work on this subject includes: Randall Schweller, "Tripolarity and the Second World War", International Studies Quarterly 37:1 (March 1993) and Randall Schweller, Deadly Imbalances: Tripolarity and Hitler's Strategy of World Conquest (Columbia University Press, 1998).

Often associated with Structural Realists like Kenneth Waltz and Stephen Walt, he may more accurately be portrayed as a Neoclassical Realist (a term coined by Gideon Rose) because of his willingness to consider non-structural explanations of state behavior (other neoclassical realists include Fareed Zakaria, Thomas J. Christensen, and William Wohlforth).  For instance: Randall Schweller and David Priess, "A Tale of Two Realisms: Expanding the Institutions Debate," Mershon International Studies Review 41:2 (April 1997)

He is also credited with reemphasizing the distinction between status-quo and revisionist states and incorporating that difference into realist theories of state behavior.  Randall Schweller, "Bandwagoning for Profit: Bringing the Revisionist State Back in", International Security 19:1 (Summer 1994) and Randall Schweller, "Neorealism's Status-Quo Bias: What Security Dilemma?" Security Studies 5:3 (Spring 1996).

His current work examines why states sometimes fail to balance (focusing on the internal dynamics of states, which directly challenges the unitary actor assumption of Structural Realism).  He has a book on this subject (2008) from Princeton University Press that is an extension of his article: "Unanswered Threats: A Neoclassical Realist Theory of Underbalancing," International Security 29:2 (Fall 2004).

References

External links
professional website and his curriculum vita
 "A Perspective From A Pro-Trump Political Science Professor"

Ohio State University faculty
Stony Brook University people
Columbia University alumni
Harvard Fellows
Living people
Year of birth missing (living people)
Neoclassical realists(international relations)